Dr. Saj-nicole Joni is a business consultant, confidential CEO advisor, speaker, and author.

Personal life 

Saj-nicole was born in 1952 in Cleveland, Ohio, USA. She was the second of four children. She left high school at the age of 16 before completing her high school requirements, so that she could accelerate her university studies. (While in her undergraduate years at college, she was awarded her high school diploma and later initiated into the Beachwood High School) Hall of Fame. Saj-nicole completed her B.A., M.A. and Ph.D. in Mathematics at University of California, San Diego. As a child, Saj-nicole studied piano at the Cleveland Institute of Music. During her university years, she also studied classical ballet and completed the dance requirements for the MFA in ballet during that time. In 1986, Saj-nicole received her Sho-dan (black-belt) in Aikido. Today, Saj-nicole resides in Cambridge, MA. She has returned to musical studies and is an accomplished pianist.  She serves as a trustee of New England Conservatory.  She is also an avid gardener and loves to cook.

Career 

At the age of 24, having completed her Ph.D., Saj-nicole joined the applied mathematics faculty of MIT, working closely with Professor Gian-Carlo Rota.  Her studies and research in combinatorics contributed to the theoretical foundations of computation.  At that time, she was the first woman in the history of MIT to serve on MIT’s applied mathematics faculty.  (When she began at MIT, there were no women’s bathrooms in building 2 where the mathematics department was housed). Saj-nicole was also appointed to the mathematics faculty at Carnegie Mellon University, and for several years, she divided her time between these two universities.  In 1978, Saj-nicole was honored by Carnegie Mellon University for excellence in teaching. In the early 1980s, Saj-nicole joined the newly forming Computer Science department at Wellesley College, and served as Chairman of that department for several years.

From 1986 to 1998, Saj-nicole built her career as an executive in several high-tech companies, including a number of years building the commercial side of Microsoft, and as a business strategy consultant, leading the financial services sector of CSC Index.

In 1998, Saj-nicole established her CEO advisory company, Cambridge International Group, Ltd. Saj-nicole advises global CEOs and top leaders in the Fortune 500. She is currently CEO of Cambridge International Group, Ltd.

Saj-nicole has served on both public and private boards. She has served as a Senior Fellow at Katzenbach Partners, a Senior Fellow at Booz & Company., a Fellow at Harvard Kennedy School's Center for Public Leadership, and as an advisory board member of the Simmons School of Management.

Publications 

Saj-nicole is a best selling author, whose most recent book, Get Big Things Done, with co-author Erica Dhawan, Palgrave Macmillan, published in 2015, and The Right Fight, with co-author Damon Beyer, Harper Collins, published in 2010. Saj-nicole’s first book, The Third Opinion, published in 2004. A frequent speaker with a regular column featured on Forbes.com, Saj-nicole has appeared on National Public Radio Marketplace, and has appeared in publications including The Harvard Business Review and Fast Company.

References

External links 

 Official Website

American management consultants
Living people
1952 births